Althepus minimus is a species of spider of the genus Althepus.

Distribution
The species is endemic to Sumatra in Indonesia. It is found at Kerinci Seblat National Park.

References

Psilodercidae
Endemic fauna of Sumatra
Spiders of Indonesia
Spiders described in 1995